Tetrachaete is a genus of plants in the grass family. The origin of the genus name is Greek, from tetra for "four" and chaite, for "bristle." There is only one known species, Tetrachaete elionuroides, native to Eritrea, Ethiopia, Somalia, Kenya, Tanzania, Yemen, and Oman.

References

External links
photo of herbarium specimen at Missouri Botanical Garden, collected in Ethiopia in 1972

Chloridoideae
Monotypic Poaceae genera